"Bury Me Alive" is the first single from the rock group We Are the Fallen's debut album, Tear the World Down.

History
It was released on February 2, 2010 exclusively online at digital media outlets. An alternate acoustic version of the song was also released on the same day via the band's official website for free with registration to their mailing list.

A previous version of the track was released on June 22, 2009 as a free download exclusively to the first 100,000 people to register an email address on the band's official website. However, due to the overwhelming number of requests for the free download, the band also decided to stream the song on their MySpace fanpage.

Music video

The music video for "Bury Me Alive" was recorded in February 2010 with director Kyle Newman. His wife Jaime King was playing the part of the woman being buried. The video uses a funeral and burial as a metaphor in comparison to a relationship ending as a result of disillusionment. The video premiered March 25, 2010 on AOL's "Noisecreep" website.

Appearances
The song was used in the trailer for the season 1 finale of The Vampire Diaries.

The song is also used in the season finale promo for MTV's The Hills.

Track listing
Digital download
 "Bury Me Alive" – 4:46

References

We Are the Fallen songs
2010 debut singles
2010 songs
Universal Republic Records singles
Songs written by Ben Moody
2010 singles